Anolis bitectus, the roof anole , is a species of lizard in the family Dactyloidae. The species is found in Ecuador.

References

Anoles
Reptiles of Ecuador
Endemic fauna of Ecuador
Reptiles described in 1864
Taxa named by Edward Drinker Cope